USS Firm (AM-98) was an  of the United States Navy. Laid down on 21 October 1941 by the Penn-Jersey Corp., Camden, New Jersey, launched on 29 May 1942, and commissioned on 10 April 1943. The vessel was reclassified as a submarine chaser PC-1602 on 1 June 1944; it was later reclassified as a control submarine chaser PCC-1602 on 1 August 1945. Very little information is available about the activities of this vessel while operating as a submarine chaser. PC-1602 was transferred to the Maritime Commission for disposal on 15 June 1948, and sold to Walter H. Wilms. Fate unknown.

References

External links
 
 Ships of the U.S. Navy, 1940-1945  PC-1602 (USS Firm)

 

Adroit-class minesweepers
Ships built in Camden, New Jersey
1942 ships
World War II minesweepers of the United States
World War II patrol vessels of the United States